Harold Joshua Medina (born 30 January 2002) is a Nicaraguan professional footballer who plays as a midfielder for Liga Primera club Real Estelí and the Nicaragua national team.

Career
A youth academy graduate of Real Estelí, Medina made his league debut on 22 August 2019 in a 3–0 win against Deportivo Las Sabanas.

Medina is a current Nicaraguan youth international. He has played for youth national teams at 2019 CONCACAF U-17 Championship and 2020 CONCACAF U-20 Championship qualifiers. In October 2020, he received maiden call-up to senior team. He made his senior debut on 11 October 2020 in a 1–1 draw against Honduras.

Career statistics

Club

International

References

External links
 

2002 births
Living people
Association football midfielders
Nicaraguan men's footballers
Nicaragua international footballers
Real Estelí F.C. players
Nicaragua under-20 international footballers
Nicaragua youth international footballers